Louis Page (1905–1990) was a French cinematographer.

Selected filmography
 The Perfume of the Lady in Black (1931)
 Sanders of the River (1935)
 Marinella (1936)
 Girls of Paris (1936)
 Forty Little Mothers (1936)
 The Silent Battle (1937)
 The Lafarge Case (1938)
 Summer Light (1943)
 The Bellman (1945)
 François Villon (1945)
 The Bouquinquant Brothers (1947)
 The Walls of Malapaga (1949)
 Old Boys of Saint-Loup (1950)
 Tuesday's Guest (1950)
 She and Me (1952)
 The Love of a Woman (1953)
 The Bride Is Much Too Beautiful (1956)
 Plucking the Daisy (1956)
 Maigret Sets a Trap (1958)
 Rue des prairies (1959)
 The Gentleman from Epsom (1962)
 Maigret Sees Red (1963)
 Monsieur (1964)

References

Bibliography
  H. Mario Raimondo-Souto. Motion Picture Photography: A History, 1891–1960. McFarland, 2006.

External links

1905 births
1990 deaths
French cinematographers
Mass media people from Lyon